Paula Dunn , (formerly Thomas, born 3 December 1964) is an English former sprinter who competed in the 100 metres, 200 metres and 4 x 100 metres relay. She represented Great Britain in all three events at the 1988 Olympic Games in Seoul. She is a five-time Commonwealth Games medallist, including winning silver (1986) and bronze (1994) in the 100 metres. During the 1990s, she competed as Paula Thomas (her then married name). Her personal bests of 11.15 secs in the 100 metres and 22.69 secs in the 200 metres, were the fastest times run by a British female sprinter during the 1990s.

Career
Born Paula Dunn in Bradford, West Yorkshire, England, she was a member of the Trafford Athletics Club (formerly Stretford). She finished sixth in the 100 metres at the 1985 AAA Championships, before making rapid progress in 1986, improving her 100 m PB from 11.67 to 11.25 secs (she also ran a wind-assisted 11.14), winning both the AAAs and UK National 100 metres titles. At that year's Commonwealth Games in Edinburgh, she won a silver medal in the 100 metres, just one one-hundredth of a second behind the winner Heather Oakes but ahead of the Canadian Olympic finalists Angella Issajenko and Angela Bailey. She then teamed up with Oakes, Kathy Cook and Joan Baptiste to win gold in the 4x100 metres relay. Later that year she placed seventh in the 100 metres final at the European Championships in Stuttgart.

In 1987, Dunn competed at the World Championships in Rome, reaching the semi-finals in the 100 metres. At the 1988 Seoul Olympics, she reached the semi-finals of the 200 metres, and also competed in the 100 metres and 4x100 metres relay. She placed fourth in the 60 metres final at the 1989 European Indoor Championships, before going on to finish second at both 100 & 200 metres at the 1989 European Cup in Gateshead, finishing behind the East Germans Katrin Krabbe and Silke Moller respectively. Also in 1989, she won her fourth consecutive AAAs 100 metres title. Between August 1986 and January 1990, Dunn was unbeaten at 100 metres by another British woman.

In January 1990, she won relay silver at the Commonwealth Games in Auckland, with Stephanie Douglas, Jennifer Stoute and Simmone Jacobs. In the summer, competing under her then married name of Paula Thomas (she would be known by this name for the remainder of her athletic career before reverting to Dunn) she won a relay bronze medal at the European Championships in Split, along with Douglas Bev Kinch and Jacobs. She competed at the 1991 and 1993 World Championships. In 1992, she had missed the entire year due to pregnancy.

Dunn reached her peak in 1994, achieving her lifetime bests at that years Commonwealth Games in Victoria. In the 100 metres she won a bronze medal in 11.23 secs, having run her pb of 11.15 secs in the semi-finals. In the 200 metres, she narrowly missed a medal running another lifetime best of 22.69 secs. These times would remain the best sprint times of the decade by a British woman. She added another bronze in the sprint relay. In 1995, she competed at her fourth World Championships in Gothenburg, reaching the semi-finals in the 200 metres. She earned selection for the 1996 Olympic Games, but was forced to withdraw due to illness. As of 2019, Dunn ranks 10th on the UK all-time list at 100 metres and 12th at 200 metres.

Later career
Dunn began working for UK Athletics in 2001 and was appointed Paralympic performance manager in 2009. After London 2012, she was promoted to the position of Paralympic head coach, replacing Peter Eriksson. She is the first female head coach appointed by UK Athletics.

National titles
6 Times AAAs National Champion – 100 metres (1986, 1987, 1988, 1989, 1995) 200 metres (1989) 
5 Times UK National Champion – 100 metres (1986, 1987, 1988) 200 metres (1987, 1988)
2 Time AAAs Indoor Champion – 60 metres (1987, 1988)

Honours and awards 
Dunn was appointed a Member of the Order of the British Empire (MBE) in the 2019 New Year Honours for services to Athletics.

International competitions

References

External links
 
 UK All-Time Lists

1964 births
Living people
Sportspeople from Bradford
English female sprinters
Olympic athletes of Great Britain
Athletes (track and field) at the 1988 Summer Olympics
Commonwealth Games gold medallists for England
Commonwealth Games silver medallists for England
Commonwealth Games bronze medallists for England
Commonwealth Games medallists in athletics
European Athletics Championships medalists
Athletes (track and field) at the 1986 Commonwealth Games
Athletes (track and field) at the 1990 Commonwealth Games
Athletes (track and field) at the 1994 Commonwealth Games
World Athletics Championships athletes for Great Britain
Black British sportswomen
Members of the Order of the British Empire
Olympic female sprinters
Medallists at the 1986 Commonwealth Games
Medallists at the 1990 Commonwealth Games
Medallists at the 1994 Commonwealth Games